The 1991 Clemson Tigers football team represented Clemson University during the 1991 NCAA Division I-A football season.

Schedule

Roster

Rankings

References

Clemson
Clemson Tigers football seasons
Atlantic Coast Conference football champion seasons
Clemson Tigers football